Salinas is a lake event in the Salar de Uyuni, Bolivia.

This series includes several phases, two major phases named Lake Tauca and Ouki as well as a few minor ones. These lake phases appear to occur in response to increased moisture supply from the Amazon. The formation of the Salinas lake was probably accompanied by a 50-100% increase of precipitation.

The Salinas event lasted between approximately 95,000 and 80,000 years ago. It was preceded by another lake event, Ouki. Alternatively, it may be part of the Ouki event, more specifically of its waning stage. The Ouki and Salinas lake cycles coincided with cooling events in the North Atlantic, glacier expansions in the Puna and with changes to alluvial fans at Llano de Chajnantor.

During the Salinas lake cycle, lake levels did not rise above  altitude, but overall lake levels were variable. Overall the lake covered a surface area of  if the Poopo basin is included, or  if not. The hydrology of the Salinas event includes water flow from the Lake Poopo into the Salar de Coipasa/Salar de Uyuni basin, as in the previous Ouki phase. This input probably did not exceed 45% of the total water supply of the Salinas lake.

References

Sources 

 
  
 

Former lakes of South America
Geology of Bolivia
Pleistocene
Lakes of Bolivia